Feng Yuxiang (6 November 1882 – 1 September 1948), courtesy name Huanzhang (焕章), was a warlord and a leader of the Republic of China from Chaohu, Anhui. He served as Vice Premier of the Republic of China from 1928 to 1930. He was also known as the "Christian General" for his zeal to convert his troops and the "Traitorous General" for his penchant to break with the establishment. In 1911 he was an officer in the ranks of Yuan Shikai's Beiyang Army but joined forces with revolutionaries against the Qing dynasty. He rose to high rank within Wu Peifu's Zhili warlord faction but launched the Beijing Coup in 1924 that knocked Zhili out of power and brought Sun Yat-sen to Beijing. He joined the Nationalist Party (KMT), supported the Northern Expedition and became blood brothers with Chiang Kai-shek, but resisted Chiang's consolidation of power in the Central Plains War and broke with him again in resisting Japanese incursions in 1933. He spent his later years supporting the Revolutionary Committee of the Kuomintang.

Early life and career
As the son of an officer in the Qing Imperial Army, Feng spent his youth immersed in military life. He joined the Huai Army when he was 11 as a deputy soldier (Fu Bing, 副兵), the lowest rank in the army, he received a uniform and food, but no salary, unlike regular soldiers. By the age of 16 he had proved himself and became a regular. Unlike other soldiers who gambled away their pay, Feng saved his salary and used a portion of it to help out other soldiers in need, especially those deputy soldiers (Fu Bing, 副兵), like he had once been, and so he was popular among his comrades-in-arms. Feng was hard-working and motivated, and in 1902 he was reassigned to Yuan Shikai's newly established Beiyang Army.

During the Xinhai Revolution of 1911 Feng joined the Luanzhou Uprising against the Qing Court and supported the revolutionaries in the South. The uprising was suppressed by the Beiyang Army and Feng was imprisoned by Yuan Shikai. In 1914 he regained military rank and spent the next four years defending Yuan's regime. In July 1914, as a brigade commander, he participated in the suppression of the Bailang Peasant Uprising in Henan and Shaanxi.  During the National Protection War of 1915–16 he was sent to Sichuan to fight the Anti-Yuan National Protection Army, but secretly communicated with revolution leader Cai E. In April 1917 he was stripped of his military rank but still led his old troops in the campaign against Zhang Xun and was restored to his rank. In February 1918 he was ordered to suppress the Constitutional Protection Movement, but proclaimed his support for peace talks in Hubei and was stripped of titles but permitted to stay in command of his forces. The capture of Changde in June earned him back his titles. By August 1921 he was promoted to command a division and was based in Shaanxi.

Conversion to Christianity
Feng, like many young officers, was involved in revolutionary activity and was nearly executed for treason. He later joined Yuan Shikai's Beiyang Army and with the help and advice of Chinese diplomat Wang Zhengting, converted to Christianity in 1914, being baptized into the Methodist Episcopal Church.

Feng's career as a warlord began soon after the collapse of the Yuan Shikai government in 1916. Feng, however, distinguished himself from other regional militarists by governing his domains with a mixture of paternalistic Christian socialism and military discipline. He forbade prostitution, gambling and the sale of opium and morphia. From 1919 he was known as the "Christian General".

In 1923 British Protestant Christian missionary Marshall B. Broomhall said of him:

The contrast between Cromwell's Ironsides and Charles's Cavaliers is not more striking than that which exists in China to-day between the godly and well-disciplined troops of General Feng and the normal type of man who in that land goes by the name of soldier ... While it is too much to say that there are no good soldiers in China outside of General Feng's army, it is none the less true that the people generally are as fearful of the presence of troops as of brigand bands.

He was reputed to have liked baptizing his troops with water from a fire hose. However, no such incident is mentioned in Sheriden's detailed biography, or in Broomhall's account. Both Broomhall and Sheriden say that baptism was taken very seriously and that not all of Feng's troops were baptized. Journalist John Gunther, in his 1939 book Inside Asia, specifically denied that such mass baptisms took place.

As a devoted Christian convert, Feng was actively promoting Christianity in China but showed no tolerance for other religions. After his troops entered Henan Province in 1927, he launched a campaign to exterminate Buddhism by expelling more than 300,000 monastic members and confiscating hundreds of Buddhist monasteries for military and other usage.

Rise

In the early 1920s Feng rose to prominence in the Zhili clique of warlords, named so because their base of power was centred around Zhili Province. This Zhili clique defeated the Fengtian clique, headed by Zhang Zuolin, father of Zhang Xueliang, in the First Zhili–Fengtian War in 1922. It was at this time that Feng also began to move closer to the Soviet Union.

Within the Zhili clique Feng was demoted by Wu Peifu and sent to guard the southern suburbs of Beijing. In 1923 Feng was inspired by Sun Yat-sen and secretly plotted with Hu Jingyi and Xue Yue to overthrow Wu Peifu and Cao Kun, who controlled the Beiyang government. When the Second Zhili–Fengtian War began in 1924, Feng was in charge of defending Rehe against the Fengtian clique. However, he switched sides and seized the capital in the Beijing Coup on 23 October 1924. This turnabout prompted Shandong warlord Zhang Zongchang to join the Fengtian and led to a decisive defeat of the Zhili forces. Hence, Feng's coup brought far-reaching political changes in China. Feng imprisoned Zhili-leader and president Cao Kun, installed the more liberal Huang Fu, evicted the last Emperor Puyi from the Forbidden City and invited Sun Yat-sen to Beijing to resurrect the Republican government and reunify the country. Despite being severely ill already, Sun came to Beijing and died there in April 1925.

Feng renamed his army the Guominjun or the National People's Army. To counter pressure from the Zhili and Fengtian factions, he invited Duan Qirui to take on the presidency. Nevertheless, Feng was defeated by a Zhili–Fengtian alliance in the Anti-Fengtian War in January 1926. He lost control of Beijing and retreated to Zhangjiakou, where his army became known as the Northwest Army.

In April 1926 Sun Yat-sen's successor, Chiang Kai-shek, launched the Northern Expedition from Guangzhou against the northern warlords. Feng threw his support behind the Nationalists in the Northern Expedition and merged his Guominjun with the National Revolutionary Army. The Nationalists vanquished the Zhili faction in the south and Feng asserted control over much of north-central China. Zhang Zuolin was forced to withdraw the Fengtian forces back to Manchuria. In August Feng went to the Soviet Union and returned in September.

In October 1928 Feng Yuxiang was appointed as Vice President of the Executive Yuan and War Minister of the Republic of China by President Chiang Kai-shek. Feng's patriotism was a basic motivation. Because of atrocities he saw Japanese soldiers commit during the Sino-Japanese War of 1895, Feng promised that he would fight the Japanese to death if he ever became a soldier. Every year on the anniversary of Japan's 21 Demands in 1915 he and his officers wore belts on which was written "In Memory of the National Humiliation of May 7th".

By early 1929 Feng grew dissatisfied with Chiang Kai-shek's Nationalist government in Nanjing. He joined Yan Xishan and Li Zongren to challenge Chiang's supremacy, but was defeated by Chiang in the Central Plains War. Chiang then incited anti-Yan Xishan and Feng Yuxiang sentiments among the Chinese Muslims and Mongols, encouraging them to topple their rule.

Out of power
Stripped of his military power, Feng spent the early 1930s criticizing Chiang Kai-shek's failure to resist Japanese aggression. On 26 May 1933, Feng Yuxiang became commander-in-chief of the Chahar People's Anti-Japanese Army Alliance, with Ji Hongchang and Fang Zhenwu as frontline commanders. Ji Hongchang's army, numbering over 100,000 men according to Feng, pushed against Duolun, and by July 1933 drove the Japanese and Manchukuoan troops out of Chahar Province. By late July Feng and Ji Hongchang established, at Zhangjiakou, the "Committee for Recovering the Four Provinces of the Northeast". Chiang Kai-shek, fearing that Communists had taken control of the Anti-Japanese Allied Army, launched a concerted siege of the army with 60,000 men. Surrounded by Chiang Kai-shek and the Japanese, Feng Yuxiang resigned his post and retired to Tai'an in Shandong.

Later years

Between 1935 and 1945 Feng Yuxiang supported the KMT and held various positions in the Nationalist army and government. In October 1935 Chiang invited him to Nanjing to serve as the vice-president of the Military Affairs Commission. He held the nominal position until 1938 and remained a member of the council until 1945. During the Xi'an Incident, when Chiang Kai-Shek was held prisoner by rebellious warlords, Feng immediately called for Chiang's release. After the Second Sino-Japanese War began in 1937 he briefly served as Commander-in-Chief of the 3rd War Area. In this capacity Feng led Chinese forces early in the defense of Shanghai, but he was quickly relieved in favor of Zhang Zhizhong and later Chiang himself.

After World War II he traveled to the United States, where he was an outspoken critic of the Chiang regime and of the Truman administration's support for it. While there, he went to Gen. Joseph Stilwell's house in California, as he admired Stilwell. Barbara Tuchman tells the story: "a few days after her husband's death, Mrs. Stilwell was upstairs at her home in Carmel, California when a visitor was announced with some confusion as 'the Christian.' Mystified, she went down to find in the hall the huge figure and cannonball head of [Feng Yuxiang], who said, 'I have come to mourn with you for Shih Ti-wei, my friend. Feng Yuxiang also visited and lived for several months in Berkeley, California, during his stay as visiting scholar.

Although he was never a Communist himself, he was close to them in his final years.

According to descendants whose father was raised by Feng Yuxiang in his household, he was inspired by the elder Feng's example of service to country and countrymen to serve in the military. 

He died in a shipboard fire on the Black Sea while en route to the Soviet Union in 1948, along with one of his daughters. Some believe he was murdered; others deny it.

The same descendants also learned from their father that many believed Feng was murdered by political adversaries. Allegedly, those who knew details of the shipboard fire and its circumstances had reported that Feng and his daughter perished in the middle of night, with their cabin door(s) locked from the outside.

The Chinese Communists under Mao Zedong classified Feng as a "good warlord", and his remains were buried with honors in 1953 at the sacred Mount Tai in Shandong. His tomb is located immediately to the east of Tianwai Village square. His widow Li Dequan served as Minister of Health of the People's Republic of China.

Legacy 
Many of Feng Yuxiang's former subordinates joined or merged into Kuomimtang National Revolutionary Army and fought with distinction in the Second Sino-Japanese War. They include Song Zheyuan, Tong Linge, Zhao Dengyu, Sun Lianzhong, Liu Ruming, Feng Zhi'an, Yang Hucheng, Ji Hongchang and Zhang Zizhong. Notable exceptions were Sun Liangcheng and Qin Dechun, who collaborated with the Japanese. Other generals, after serving a lengthy term in the warlord era, retired to live a life of pleasure.

Sir Richard Evans, author of Deng Xiaoping and the Making of Modern China, described Feng as "an honest man" in his book. Peter R. Moody wrote in the Annals of the American Academy of Political and Social Science "Many of Feng's allies might dispute this, since he betrayed every one of them."

See also

Warlord Era
Central Plains War
History of the Republic of China
National Revolutionary Army
Second Sino-Japanese War
Actions in Inner Mongolia (1933–36)

References

Further reading
Marshall Broomhall; Marshal Feng: A Good Soldier of Jesus Christ; London: China Inland Mission and Religious Tract Society, 1923.
Jonathan Goforth; Chinese Christian General: Feng Yu Hsiang
James E. Sheridan; Chinese Warlord: The Career of Feng Yu-hsiang.  Stanford University 1966.
 United Press, Christian General Feng Charges British Caused Rioting, Evening Independent, 15 July 1925 (Statement of General Feng to the United Press on the Shanghai and Canton riots)
 Feng Yu-hsiang (Feng Yuxiang) 馮玉祥 from Biographies of Prominent Chinese c. 1925.

External links

Handbook for the Chinese Civil War - US Naval War College
RESISTANCE WARS

"Toward Righteousness!". Time. 31 July 1933. 

 

1882 births
1948 deaths
Vice presidents of the Republic of China
Chinese military personnel of World War II
Converts to Methodism
Republic of China warlords from Anhui
National Revolutionary Army generals from Anhui
Deaths due to ship fires
Burials in China
Chinese Methodists
People from Chaohu
Defense Ministers of the Republic of China
People of the Northern Expedition
People of the Central Plains War
Empire of China (1915–1916)
Members of the Methodist Episcopal Church
Politicians from Hefei
People who died at sea
Huai Army personnel